Sayyed Jalal-ed-Din Ashtiani  (1925–2005) was an Iranian professor of philosophy and Islamic mysticism. In addition to Iranian sheikhs, Ashtiani's many students included William Chittick from the US, Christian Bonaud from France, and Matsu Muto from Japan.

References 

Iranian Shia scholars of Islam
Islamic philosophers
Recipients of the Order of Knowledge
Iranian Science and Culture Hall of Fame recipients in Philosophy
Burials at Imam Reza Shrine